The Diadocidiidae are a family of flies (Diptera), containing one extant genus with over 20 species and one extinct genus. Diadocidiidae are found worldwide, except in Africa and Antarctica. They are usually considered close to the Keroplatidae, Bolitophilidae, and Ditomyiidae, and used to be included in the Mycetophilidae. They are woodland flies, found in shaded places in forests or near streams. The larvae spin silken tubes under bark or in dead logs, and feed on hymenium of Polyporaceae fungi. The average body length for adults is around 2.5–5.6 mm.

Genera 

 Diadocidia Ruthe 1831 Eocene-Present
 †Docidiadia Blagoderov and Grimaldi 2004 Burmese amber, Myanmar, Cenomanian

References

Further reading
Laštovka P. & Matile L. 1972 Révision des Diadocidia Holarctiques [Dipt. Mycetophilidae]. Annales de la Société Entomologique de France (N. S.) 8: 205-223.

External links

EOL
Diptera.info Image

 
Nematocera families
Sciaroidea